Vallenar is a city and commune in Atacama Region, Chile. It is the capital of the Huasco Province and is located in the valley of the Huasco River. Vallenar has 52,000 inhabitants. Its main activities are farming and mining. It was founded as San Ambrosio de Ballenary by Ambrose O'Higgins in 1789,  after his birthplace in Ballynary in County Sligo, Ireland.

Demographics
According to the 2002 census by the National Statistics Institute, Vallenar had 48,040 inhabitants (23,284 men and 24,756 women). Of these, 43,750 (91.1%) lived in urban areas and 4,290 (8.9%) in rural areas. The population grew by 1.7% (792 persons) between the 1992 and 2002 censuses.

Administration
As a commune, Vallenar is a third-level administrative division of Chile administered by a municipal council, headed by an alcalde who is directly elected every four years. The 2008-2012 alcalde is Cristian Tapia Ramos.

Within the electoral divisions of Chile, Vallenar is represented in the Chamber of Deputies by Mr. Alberto Robles (PRSD) and Mr. Giovanni Calderón  (UDI) as part of the 6th electoral district, (together with Caldera, Tierra Amarilla, Freirina, Huasco and Alto del Carmen). The commune is represented in the Senate by Isabel Allende Bussi (PS) and Baldo Prokurica Prokurica (RN) as part of the 3rd senatorial constituency (Atacama Region).

Climate

Notable people
 Yasna Provoste
 Ricardo Francisco Rojas

References

External links
  Municipality of Vallenar

Capitals of Chilean provinces
Communes of Chile
Populated places in Huasco Province
Atacama Desert
Populated places established in 1789
1789 establishments in the Spanish Empire